Hadad, Haddad, Adad (Akkadian: 𒀭𒅎 DIM, pronounced as Adād), or Iškur (Sumerian) was the storm and rain god in the Canaanite and ancient Mesopotamian religions.
He was attested in Ebla as "Hadda" in c. 2500 BCE. From the Levant, Hadad was introduced to Mesopotamia by the Amorites, where he became known as the Akkadian (Assyrian-Babylonian) god Adad. Adad and Iškur are usually written with the logogram  —the same symbol used for the Hurrian god Teshub. Hadad was also called Pidar, Rapiu, Baal-Zephon, or often simply Baʿal (Lord), but this title was also used for other gods. The bull was the symbolic animal of Hadad. He appeared bearded, often holding a club and thunderbolt while wearing a bull-horned headdress. Hadad was equated with the Greek god Zeus, the Roman god Jupiter (and in the cult-center near Doliche in Asia Minor he was addressed as Jupiter Dolichenus), as well as the Hittite storm-god Teshub.

The Baal Cycle, also known as the Epic of Baal, is a collection of stories about the god Baal from the Canaanite area who is also referred to as Hadad, the storm-god. This collection of stories is dated between 1400 and 1200 B.C. and was found in Ugarit, an ancient city located in modern-day Syria.

Adad in Akkad and Sumer
In Akkadian, Adad is also known as Rammanu ("Thunderer") cognate with  Raˁmā and  Raˁam, which was a byname of Hadad. Rammanu was formerly incorrectly taken by many scholars to be an independent Akkadian god later identified with Hadad.

Though originating in northern Mesopotamia, Adad was identified by the same Sumerogram  that designated Iškur in the south. His worship became widespread in Mesopotamia after the First Babylonian dynasty. A text dating from the reign of Ur-Ninurta characterizes Adad/Iškur as both threatening in his stormy rage and generally life-giving and benevolent.

The form Iškur appears in the list of gods found at Shuruppak but was of far less importance, probably partly because storms and rain were scarce in Sumer and agriculture there depended on irrigation instead. The gods Enlil and Ninurta also had storm god features that decreased Iškur's distinctiveness. He sometimes appears as the assistant or companion of one or the other of the two.

When Enki distributed the destinies, he made Iškur inspector of the cosmos. In one litany, Iškur is proclaimed again and again as "great radiant bull, your name is heaven" and also called son of Anu, lord of Karkara; twin-brother of Enki, lord of abundance, lord who rides the storm, lion of heaven.

In other texts Adad/Iškur is sometimes son of the moon god Nanna/Sin by Ningal and brother of Utu/Shamash and Inanna/Ishtar. Iškur is also sometimes described as the son of Enlil.

The bull was portrayed as Adad/Iškur's sacred animal starting in the Old Babylonian period (the first half of the 2nd millennium BCE).

Adad/Iškur's consort (both in early Sumerian and the much later Assyrian texts) was Shala, a goddess of grain, who is also sometimes associated with the god Dagānu. She was also called Gubarra in the earliest texts. The fire god Gibil (named Gerra in Akkadian) is sometimes the son of Iškur and Shala.

He is identified with the Anatolian storm-god Teshub, whom the Mitannians designated with the same Sumerogram . Occasionally Adad/Iškur is identified with the god Amurru, the god of the Amorites.

The Babylonian center of Adad/Iškur's cult was Karkara in the south, his chief temple being ; his spouse Shala was worshipped in a temple named . In Assyria, Adad was developed along with his warrior aspect. During the Middle Assyrian Empire, from the reign of Tiglath-Pileser I (1115–1077 BCE), Adad had a double sanctuary in Assur which he shared with Anu. Anu is often associated with Adad in invocations. The name Adad and various alternate forms and bynames (Dadu, Bir, Dadda) are often found in the names of the Assyrian kings.

Adad/Iškur presents two aspects in the hymns, incantations, and votive inscriptions. On the one hand he is the god who, through bringing on the rain in due season, causes the land to become fertile, and, on the other hand, the storms that he sends out bring havoc and destruction. He is pictured on monuments and cylinder seals (sometimes with a horned helmet) with the lightning and the thunderbolt (sometimes in the form of a spear), and in the hymns the sombre aspects of the god on the whole predominate. His association with the sun-god, Shamash, due to the natural combination of the two deities who alternate in the control of nature, leads to imbuing him with some of the traits belonging to a solar deity.

According to Alberto Green, descriptions of Adad starting in the Kassite period and in the region of Mari emphasize his destructive, stormy character and his role as a fearsome warrior deity, in contrast to Iškur's more peaceful and pastoral character.

Shamash and Adad became in combination the gods of oracles and of divination in general. Whether the will of the gods is determined through the inspection of the liver of the sacrificial animal, through observing the action of oil bubbles in a basin of water or through the observation of the movements of the heavenly bodies, it is Shamash and Adad who, in the ritual connected with divination, are invariably invoked. Similarly in the annals and votive inscriptions of the kings, when oracles are referred to, Shamash and Adad are always named as the gods addressed, and their ordinary designation in such instances is bele biri ("lords of divination").

Hadad in Ugarit

In religious texts, Ba‘al/Hadad is the lord of the sky who governs the rain and thus the germination of plants with the power to determine fertility. He is the protector of life and growth to the agricultural people of the region. The absence of Ba‘al causes dry spells, starvation, death, and chaos. 

In texts from Ugarit, El, the supreme god of the pantheon, resides on Mount Lel (perhaps meaning "Night") and it is there that the assembly of the gods meet. 

The Baal Cycle is fragmentary and leaves much unexplained that would have been obvious to a contemporary. In the earliest extant sections there appears to be some sort of feud between El and Ba‘al. El makes one of his sons who is called both prince Yamm ("Sea") and judge Nahar ("River") king over the gods and changes Yamm's name from yw (so spelled at that point in the text) to mdd ’il, meaning "Darling of El". El informs Yamm that in order to secure his power, Yamm will have to drive Ba‘al from his throne.

At ‘Athtart's urging Ba‘al "scatters" Yamm and proclaims that Yamm is dead and heat is assured.

A later passage refers to Ba‘al's victory over Lotan, the many-headed sea-dragon. Due to gaps in the text it is not known whether Lotan is another name for Yamm or a reference to another similar story. In the Mediterranean area, crops were often threatened by winds, storms, and floods from the sea, indicating why the ancients feared the fury of this cosmic being.

A palace is built for Ba‘al/Hadad with cedars from Mount Lebanon and Sirion and also from silver and from gold. In his new palace Ba‘al hosts a great feast for the other gods. When urged by Kothar-wa-Khasis, Ba’al, somewhat reluctantly, opens a window in his palace and sends forth thunder and lightning. He then invites Mot 'Death' (god of drought and underworld), another son of El, to the feast.

But Mot is insulted. The eater of human flesh and blood will not be satisfied with bread and wine. Mot threatens to break Ba‘al into pieces and swallow Ba‘al. Even Ba‘al cannot stand against Death. Gaps here make interpretation dubious. It seems that by the advice of the goddess Shapash 'Sun', Ba‘al has intercourse with a heifer and dresses the resultant calf in his own clothes as a gift to Mot and then himself prepares to go down to the underworld in the guise of a helpless shade. News of Ba‘al's apparent death leads even El to mourn. ‘Anat, Ba‘al's sister, finds Ba‘al's corpse, presumably really the dead body of the calf, and she buries the body with a funeral feast. The god ‘Athtar is appointed to take Ba‘al's place, but he is a poor substitute. Meanwhile, ‘Anat finds Mot, cleaves him with a sword, burns him with fire, and throws his remains on the field for the birds to eat. But the earth is still cracked with drought until Shapsh fetches Ba‘al back.

Seven years later Mot returns and attacks Ba‘al in a battle which ceases only when Shapsh tells Mot that El now supports Ba’al. Thereupon Mot at once surrenders to Ba‘al/Hadad and recognizes Ba‘al as king.

Hadad in Egypt
In the Amherst Papyrus, Baal Zephon (Hadad) is identified with the Egyptian god Horus:  "May Baal from Zephon bless you", Amherst Papyrus 63, 7:3 and in 11:13-14:  "and from Zephon may Horus help us". Classical sources translate this name as Zeus Kasios, since in Pelusium, the statue of Zeus Kasios was considered the image of Harpocrates (Horus the Child). Zeus Casius had inherited some traits from Apollo as well. They also recall his conflict with Typhon over that mountain (Mount Casius on the Syrian-Turkish border or Casion near Pelusium in Egypt). The reason why Baal could be both identified with Horus and his rival Set; is because in Egypt the element of the storm was considered foreign as Set was a god of strangers and outsiders, thus because the Egyptians had no better alternative to identify their native god Set with another neighboring deity, they tentatively associated him with Hadad since he was a storm-god, but when the god Baal (Hadad) is not specifically attributed the traits of rain and thunder and is instead perceived as a god of the sky generically, which is what is embodied by his form "Baal Zaphon" as the chief deity who resides on the mountain (for example a 14th-century letter from the king of Ugarit to the Egyptian pharaoh places Baʿal Zaphon as equivalent to Amun also), in that case he's more similar to the Egyptian Horus in that capacity (comparable to Baalshamin as well). The different interpretation could also be based on the fact that Set had been associated with Hadad by the Hyksos. Most likely originally Set referred to another deity also addressed by the title "Baal" (one of the many - an example of this would be the Baal of Tyre) who happened to display storm-like traits especially in Egypt since they were foreign and as such duly emphasized; when instead his weather features probably weren't all that prominent in other cultures who worshipped equivalents of him, but given that the only storm-god available for identification in Semitic culture was Hadad and in Hittite Sutekh (a war-god who's been hypothesized to be an alternative name of Teshub, but it remains unclear), the traits matched the characteristics of the Egyptian deity, and an association between the two was considered plausible, also given by the fact that both the Hittites and Semitic Hyksos were foreigners in the Egyptian land who brought their gods with them, and their main god happened to display storm-like traits and was also associated with these foreigners who came to Egypt, a characteristic that would make him similar to the perception that the Egyptians had of Set. This would once again echo the mythological motif of a previous chief of the Pantheon who gets replaced by the new generation of deities represented by the younger ascendant ruler and newly appointed chief of the gods, as is the case also for the Hittite "Cycle of Kumarbi" where Teshub displaces the previously established father of the gods Kumarbi. In Amherst XII/15 the same identification as before is once again stated: "Baal from Zephon, Horus" (BT mn Şpn Hr).

Hadad in Aram and ancient Israel

In the second millennium BCE, the king of Yamhad or Halab (modern Aleppo) received a statue of Ishtar from the king of Mari, as a sign of deference, to be displayed in the temple of Hadad located in Halab Citadel. The king of Aleppo called himself "the beloved of Hadad". The god is called "the god of Aleppo" on a stele of the Assyrian king Shalmaneser I.

The element Hadad appears in a number of theophoric names borne by kings of the region. Hadad son of Bedad, who defeated the Midianites in the country of Moab, was the fourth king of Edom. Hadadezer ("Hadad-is-help"), the Aramean king defeated by David. Later Aramean kings of Damascus seem to have habitually assumed the title of Ben-Hadad, or son of Hadad, just as a series of Egyptian monarchs are known to have been accustomed to call themselves sons of Ammon. An example is Ben-Hadad, the king of Aram whom Asa, king of Judah, is said to have employed to invade the northern Kingdom of Israel. In the 9th or 8th century BCE, the name of Ben-Hadad 'Son of Hadad', king of Aram, is inscribed on his votive basalt stele dedicated to Melqart, found in Bredsh, a village north of Aleppo. A Hadad was also the seventh of the twelve sons of Ishmael.

A set of related bynames include the Aramaic , Old South Arabic , Hebrew , and Akkadian  ("Thunderer"), presumably originally vocalized as Ramān in Aramaic and Hebrew. The Hebrew spelling  with Masoretic vocalization Rimmôn is identical with the Hebrew word meaning 'pomegranate' and may be an intentional misspelling and parody of the original.

The word Hadad-rimmon, for which the inferior reading Hadar-rimmon is found in some manuscripts in the phrase "the mourning of (or at) Hadad-rimmon", has been a subject of much discussion. According to Jerome and all the older Christian interpreters, the mourning is for something that occurred at a place called Hadad-rimmon (Maximianopolis) in the valley of Megiddo. The event alluded to was generally held to be the death of Josiah (or, as in the Targum, the death of Ahab at the hands of Hadadrimmon). But even before the discovery of the Ugaritic texts some suspected that Hadad-rimmon might be a dying-and-rising god like Adonis or Tammuz, perhaps even the same as Tammuz, and the allusion could then be to mournings for Hadad such as those which usually accompanied the Adonis festivals. T. K. Cheyne pointed out that the Septuagint reads simply Rimmon, and argues that this may be a corruption of Migdon (Megiddo), in itself a corruption of Tammuz-Adon. He would render the verse, "In that day there shall be a great mourning in Jerusalem, as the mourning of the women who weep for Tammuz-Adon" (Adon means "lord"). No further evidence has come to light to resolve such speculations.

Sanchuniathon
In Sanchuniathon's account Hadad is once called Adodos, but is mostly named Demarûs. This is a puzzling form, probably from  Ugaritic , which appears in parallelism with Hadad, or possibly a Greek corruption of Hadad Ramān. Sanchuniathon's Hadad is son of Sky by a concubine who is then given to the god Dagon while she is pregnant by Sky. This appears to be an attempt to combine two accounts of Hadad's parentage, one of which is the Ugaritic tradition that Hadad was son of Dagon. The cognate Akkadian god Adad is also often called the son of Anu ("Sky"). The corresponding Hittite god Teshub is likewise son of Anu (after a fashion).

In Sanchuniathon's account, it is Sky who first fights against Pontus ("Sea"). Then Sky allies himself with Hadad. Hadad takes over the conflict but is defeated, at which point unfortunately no more is said of this matter. Sanchuniathion agrees with Ugaritic tradition in making Muth, the Ugaritic Mot, whom he also calls "Death", the son of El.

Hadad in the Bible

In the Bible, Hadad is referenced multiple times as a god worshipped by non-believers of Yahweh, the god of the Israelites. 

Hadad is usually referred to as ba'al and is characterized and seen as a god who wants the same power and authority that the God of the Israelites holds in Judeo-Christianity.

In the Books of Kings, Jezebel – the wife of the Northern Israelite King Ahab – served as an advocate of Hadad in her adopted nation. She enters into conflict with the prophet Elijah over which deity is more powerful and authoritative. In the end, Elijah is able to prove the superiority of Yahweh. Jezebel, therefore, wishes to murder Elijah, causing him to flee and despair. Ahab and Jezebel  both eventually die in a gruesome manner and are overthrown by the events God told Elijah to instruct his pupil, Elisha, to orchestrate.

See also

Baal
Ancient Mesopotamian religion
Baal Cycle

Notes

References
 .
 Driver, Godfrey Rolles, and John C. L. Gibson. Canaanite Myths and Legends. Edinburgh: Clark, 1978. .
 
 Hadad, Husni & Mja'is, Salim (1993) Ba'al Haddad, A Study of Ancient Religious History of Syria
 
 .
 .
 
 .

External links

 Jewish Encyclopedia
 Britannica Online Encyclopedia
  Online text:  The Epic of Ba'al (Hadad)
  Kadash Kinahu: Complete Directory
 Gateways to Babylon: Adad/Rimon
 Ancient Mesopotamian Gods and Goddesses: Iškur/Adad (god)
 Britannica Online Encyclopedia
 Mesopotamian Gods: Adad (Ishkur)
 Stela with the storm god Adad brandishing thunderbolts

Mesopotamian gods
Levantine mythology
Sky and weather gods
Thunder gods
West Semitic gods
Phoenician mythology
Hellenistic Asian deities
Rain deities
Baal
Jovian deities
Cattle deities